Migel-Max Schmeling (born 17 February 2000) is a German footballer who plays as a left-back for TuS Bövinghausen.

Career
Schmeling made his professional debut for MSV Duisburg in the DFB-Pokal on 11 August 2019 in the home match against Greuther Fürth. His starting debut came on 21 September 2019, in a 2–1 win against 1860 Munich. He left Duisburg at the end of the 2019–20 season.

On 8 July 2020, he signed with Borussia Dortmund II.

In June 2021, he signed for SC Verl of the 3. Liga. He agreed the termination of his contract in August due to a "family incident" which required his attention and which was incompatible with playing professionally.

Career statistics

References

External links

2000 births
Living people
Sportspeople from Gelsenkirchen
Footballers from North Rhine-Westphalia
German footballers
Association football fullbacks
MSV Duisburg players
Borussia Dortmund II players
SC Verl players
3. Liga players
Regionalliga players
Oberliga (football) players